At least two ships of the Argentine Navy have been named Spiro:

 , a  commissioned in 1938 and decommissioned in 1962.
 , an  launched in 1983.

Argentine Navy ship names